Tirathaba monoleuca is a species of moth in the family Pyralidae. It was described by Oswald Bertram Lower in 1894. It is found in Australia.

References 

Moths described in 1894
Tirathabini